eCache was a digital gold currency (DBC) provider that operated over the Tor network from 2007–2014.

eCache was completely anonymous just like physical cash. The eCache mint which issued the certificates didn't store any transaction details or personally identifiable information that was requested from the mint or any other user.

References

 DGC Magazine Interview with eCache's operators

Digital currencies
Financial cryptography